Acrothamnus is a  genus of flowering plants in the family Ericaceae. The species, which were formerly included in the genus Leucopogon, occur in eastern Australia, New Zealand, New Guinea and the Pacific. They include:

Acrothamnus colensoi  (Hook.f.) Quinn 
Acrothamnus hookeri  (Sond.) Quinn 
Acrothamnus maccraei  (F.Muell.) Quinn - subalpine beard-heath
Acrothamnus spathaceus  (Pedley) Quinn
Acrothamnus suaveolens  (Hook.f.) Quinn

References

Epacridoideae
Ericaceae genera
Ericales of Australia